This is a list of the main career statistics of French former professional tennis player, Jo-Wilfried Tsonga. Tsonga has won 18 ATP titles in singles, including 2 Masters titles at the 2008 Paris Masters and the 2014 Canada Masters. He was also the runner-up at the 2008 Australian Open and 2011 ATP World Tour Finals in singles. In addition, he was a silver medalist in men's doubles with Michaël Llodra at the 2012 London Olympics.

Career achievements 

Tsonga reached his first career singles final and first Grand Slam singles final at the 2008 Australian Open. In the first round, Tsonga upset 9th seed Andy Murray in four sets and eventually reached the final after upsetting then world No. 2 Rafael Nadal in straight sets in the semifinals. In the final, Tsonga lost to the world No. 3 Novak Djokovic in four sets, after winning the first set, which was the only set which Djokovic dropped during the entire tournament. Following the event, Tsonga entered the Top 20 of the ATP rankings for the first time in his career, rising to world No. 18. In September of the same year, Tsonga avenged his Australian Open loss to Djokovic by defeating the Serb in the final of the PTT Thailand Open to win his first career singles title. Two months later, Tsonga defeated David Nalbandian in the final of the BNP Paribas Masters in Paris to win his first ATP Masters Series (later ATP World Tour Masters 1000) singles title, along with 3 Top 10 wins en route to the title, including a third round victory over Djokovic. Tsonga thus became the first home player to win it since Sébastien Grosjean in 2001 and remains the last home player to win it to date. Though he only played in a few tournaments, Tsonga's results throughout the year allowed him to qualify for the year-end ATP World Tour Finals for the first time in his career. However, he lost in the round robin stage after winning one of his three matches, which was his 3rd victory of the year against Djokovic. Tsonga finished the year at a then career-high singles ranking of world No. 6.

Since 2009, the highlights of Tsonga's career have been runner-up appearances at the 2011 BNP Paribas Masters and 2011 ATP World Tour Finals and semifinal appearances at the 2010 Australian Open, 2011 and 2012 Wimbledon Championships, along with 2013 and 2015 French Open.

In July 2011, Tsonga became the first player to have defeated each member of the "Big Four" at Grand Slam tournaments, after defeating Roger Federer at the 2011 Wimbledon Championships from 2 sets down. This feat was not repeated until 4 years later. He defeated Andy Murray and Rafael Nadal at the 2008 Australian Open, Novak Djokovic at the 2010 Australian Open and Roger Federer at the 2011 Wimbledon Championships and later, at the 2013 French Open.

In February 2012, Tsonga achieved a new career high singles ranking of world No. 5.

In August 2014, Tsonga won another Masters title in Toronto, becoming the first French player to win the title. He also became the 2nd player ever to defeat 3 members of the Big Four in the same tournament: reigning world No. 1 Djokovic in the third round, Murray in the quarterfinals, and Federer in the final.

Significant finals

Grand Slam tournaments

Singles: 1 (1 runner-up)

Year-end championships

Singles: 1 (1 runner-up)

Masters 1000 tournaments

Singles: 4 (2 titles, 2 runner-ups)

Doubles: 1 (1 title)

Olympic medal matches

Men's doubles: 1 (1 silver medal)

ATP Tour finals

Singles: 30 (18 titles, 12 runner-ups)

Doubles: 8 (4 titles, 4 runner-ups)

Performance timelines

Singles
{|class="nowrap wikitable" style=text-align:center;font-size:90%
|-
!Tournament!!2003!!2004!!2005!!2006!!2007!!2008!!2009!!2010!!2011!!2012!!2013!!2014!!2015!!2016!!2017!!2018!!2019!!2020!!2021
!2022!!SR!!W–L!!Win%
|-
|colspan=24 align=left|Grand Slam Tournaments
|-
|bgcolor=efefef align=left|Australian Open
|A
|A
|A
|A
|bgcolor=afeeee|1R
|bgcolor=thistle|F
|bgcolor=ffebcd|QF
|bgcolor=yellow|SF
|bgcolor=afeeee|3R
|bgcolor=afeeee|4R
|bgcolor=ffebcd|QF
|bgcolor=afeeee|4R
|A
|bgcolor=afeeee|4R
|bgcolor=ffebcd|QF
|bgcolor=afeeee|3R
|bgcolor=afeeee|2R
|bgcolor=afeeee|1R
|A
|A
|bgcolor=efefef|0 / 13
|bgcolor=efefef|37–13
|bgcolor=efefef|
|-
|bgcolor=efefef align=left|French Open
|bgcolor=f0f8ff|Q2
|bgcolor=f0f8ff|Q2
|bgcolor=afeeee|1R
|A
|A
|A
|bgcolor=afeeee|4R
|bgcolor=afeeee|4R
|bgcolor=afeeee|3R
|bgcolor=ffebcd|QF
|bgcolor=yellow|SF
|bgcolor=afeeee|4R
|bgcolor=yellow|SF
|bgcolor=afeeee|3R
|bgcolor=afeeee|1R
|A
|bgcolor=afeeee|2R
|A
|bgcolor=afeeee|1R
|bgcolor=afeeee|1R
|bgcolor=efefef|0 / 13
|bgcolor=efefef|28–13
|bgcolor=efefef|
|-
|bgcolor=efefef align=left|Wimbledon
|A
|A
|A
|A
|bgcolor=afeeee|4R
|A
|bgcolor=afeeee|3R
|bgcolor=ffebcd|QF
|bgcolor=yellow|SF
|bgcolor=yellow|SF
|bgcolor=afeeee|2R
|bgcolor=afeeee|4R
|bgcolor=afeeee|3R
|bgcolor=ffebcd|QF
|bgcolor=afeeee|3R
|A
|bgcolor=afeeee|3R
|style=color:#767676|NH
|bgcolor=afeeee|1R
|A
|bgcolor=efefef|0 / 12
|bgcolor=efefef|32–12
|bgcolor=efefef|
|-
|bgcolor=efefef align=left|US Open
|A
|bgcolor=f0f8ff|Q2
|A
|A
|bgcolor=afeeee|3R
|bgcolor=afeeee|3R
|bgcolor=afeeee|4R
|A
|bgcolor=ffebcd|QF
|bgcolor=afeeee|2R
|A
|bgcolor=afeeee|4R
|bgcolor=ffebcd|QF
|bgcolor=ffebcd|QF
|bgcolor=afeeee|2R
|A
|bgcolor=afeeee|1R
|A
|A
|A
|bgcolor=efefef|0 / 10
|bgcolor=efefef|24–10
|bgcolor=efefef|
|-
!style=text-align:left|Win–loss
!0–0
!0–0
!0–1
!0–0
!5–3
!8–2
!12–4
!12–3
!13–4
!13–4
!10–3
!12–4
!11–3
!13–4
!7–4
!2–1
!4–4
!0–1
!0–2
!0–0
!0 / 47
!121–47
!
|-
|colspan=24 align=left|Year-end championship
|-
|bgcolor=efefef align=left|Tour Finals
|colspan=5 |did not qualify
|bgcolor=afeeee|RR
|colspan=2 |DNQ
|bgcolor=thistle|F
|bgcolor=afeeee|RR
|colspan=10 |did not qualify
!0 / 3
!4–7
!36%
|-
|colspan=24 align=left|National representation
|-
|bgcolor=efefef align=left|Summer Olympics
|colspan=1 style=color:#767676|NH
|A
|colspan=3 style=color:#767676|not held
|A
|colspan=3 style=color:#767676|not held
|bgcolor=ffebcd|QF
|colspan=3 style=color:#767676|not held
|bgcolor=afeeee|2R
|colspan=4 style=color:#767676|not held
|A
|colspan=1 style=color:#767676|NH
!0 / 2
!4–2
!67%
|-
|bgcolor=efefef align=left|Davis Cup
|A
|A
|A
|A
|A
|bgcolor=ffebcd|QF
|bgcolor=afeeee|1R
|bgcolor=thistle|F
|bgcolor=yellow|SF
|bgcolor=ffebcd|QF
|bgcolor=ffebcd|QF
|bgcolor=thistle|F
|bgcolor=ffebcd|QF
|bgcolor=yellow|SF
|bgcolor=lime|W
|bgcolor=thistle|F
|style=background:#afeeee|RR
|style=color:#767676|NH
|A
|A
!1 / 11
!22–10
!70%
|-
|colspan=24 align=left|ATP World Tour Masters 1000
|-
|bgcolor=efefef align=left|Indian Wells Masters
|A
|A
|bgcolor=f0f8ff|Q1
|A
|A
|bgcolor=afeeee|4R
|bgcolor=afeeee|3R
|bgcolor=afeeee|4R
|bgcolor=afeeee|2R
|bgcolor=afeeee|4R
|bgcolor=ffebcd|QF
|bgcolor=afeeee|2R
|A
|bgcolor=ffebcd|QF
|bgcolor=afeeee|2R
|A
|A
| rowspan="4" style="color:#767676" |NH
|A
|A
|bgcolor=efefef|0 / 9
|bgcolor=efefef|13–9
|bgcolor=efefef|59%
|-
|bgcolor=efefef align=left|Miami Open
|A
|A
|bgcolor=f0f8ff|Q1
|A
|A
|bgcolor=afeeee|3R
|bgcolor=ffebcd|QF
|bgcolor=ffebcd|QF
|bgcolor=afeeee|3R
|bgcolor=ffebcd|QF
|bgcolor=afeeee|4R
|bgcolor=afeeee|4R
|bgcolor=afeeee|3R
|bgcolor=afeeee|3R
|A
|A
|bgcolor=f0f8ff|Q2
|A
|bgcolor=afeeee|1R
|bgcolor=efefef|0 / 10
|bgcolor=efefef|17–10
|bgcolor=efefef|65%
|-
|bgcolor=efefef align=left|Monte-Carlo Masters
|A
|A
|A
|A
|A
|A
|A
|bgcolor=afeeee|3R
|bgcolor=afeeee|2R
|bgcolor=ffebcd|QF
|bgcolor=yellow|SF
|bgcolor=ffebcd|QF
|bgcolor=afeeee|3R
|bgcolor=yellow|SF
|bgcolor=afeeee|2R
|A
|bgcolor=afeeee|1R
|A
|bgcolor=afeeee|1R
|bgcolor=efefef|0 / 10
|bgcolor=efefef|14–10
|bgcolor=efefef|58%
|-
|bgcolor=efefef align=left|Madrid Open
|A
|A
|A
|A
|A
|bgcolor=afeeee|2R
|bgcolor=afeeee|2R
|bgcolor=afeeee|2R
|bgcolor=afeeee|3R
|bgcolor=afeeee|3R
|bgcolor=ffebcd|QF
|bgcolor=afeeee|2R
|bgcolor=afeeee|3R
|bgcolor=afeeee|3R
|bgcolor=afeeee|2R
|A
|A
|A
|A
|bgcolor=efefef|0 / 10
|bgcolor=efefef|11–9
|bgcolor=efefef|55%
|-
|bgcolor=efefef align=left|Italian Open
|A
|A
|A
|A
|A
|bgcolor=afeeee|1R
|bgcolor=afeeee|1R
|bgcolor=ffebcd|QF
|bgcolor=afeeee|2R
|bgcolor=ffebcd|QF
|bgcolor=afeeee|2R
|bgcolor=afeeee|3R
|bgcolor=afeeee|2R
|A
|A
|A
|bgcolor=afeeee|1R
|A
|A
|A
|bgcolor=efefef|0 / 9
|bgcolor=efefef|8–9
|bgcolor=efefef|47%
|-
|bgcolor=efefef align=left|Canadian Open
|A
|A
|A
|A
|A
|A
|bgcolor=yellow|SF
|A
|bgcolor=yellow|SF
|bgcolor=afeeee|2R
|A
|bgcolor=lime|W
|bgcolor=ffebcd|QF
|A
|bgcolor=afeeee|2R
|A
|bgcolor=afeeee|1R
|style=color:#767676|NH
|A
|A
|bgcolor=efefef|1 / 7
|bgcolor=efefef|16–6
|bgcolor=efefef|73%
|-
|bgcolor=efefef align=left|Cincinnati Masters
|A
|A
|A
|A
|A
|A
|bgcolor=afeeee|2R
|A
|bgcolor=afeeee|2R
|A
|A
|bgcolor=afeeee|1R
|bgcolor=afeeee|1R
|bgcolor=afeeee|3R
|bgcolor=afeeee|2R
|A
|A
|A
|A
|A
|bgcolor=efefef|0 / 6
|bgcolor=efefef|2–6
|bgcolor=efefef|25%
|-
|bgcolor=efefef align=left|Shanghai Masters
|A
|A
|A
|A
|A
|bgcolor=afeeee|3R
|bgcolor=afeeee|3R
|bgcolor=ffebcd|QF
|bgcolor=afeeee|2R
|bgcolor=ffebcd|QF
|bgcolor=yellow|SF
|A
|bgcolor=thistle|F
|bgcolor=ffebcd|QF
|A
|A
|A
| colspan="2" style="color:#767676" |NH
|A
|bgcolor=efefef|0 / 8
|bgcolor=efefef|18–8
|bgcolor=efefef|69%
|-
|bgcolor=efefef align=left|Paris Masters
|A
|bgcolor=afeeee|2R
|A
|bgcolor=f0f8ff|Q2
|bgcolor=afeeee|2R
|bgcolor=lime|W
|bgcolor=ffebcd|QF
|A
|bgcolor=thistle|F
|bgcolor=ffebcd|QF
|bgcolor=afeeee|2R
|bgcolor=afeeee|3R
|bgcolor=afeeee|3R
|bgcolor=ffebcd|QF
|bgcolor=afeeee|2R
|bgcolor=afeeee|1R
|bgcolor=ffebcd|QF
|A
|A
|A
|bgcolor=efefef|1 / 13
|bgcolor=efefef|21–12
|bgcolor=efefef|64%
|-
!style=text-align:left|Win–loss
!0–0
!1–1
!0–0
!0–0
!1–1
!10–5
!11–8
!11–6
!13–9
!14–8
!13–7
!14–7
!15–8
!14–7
!1–5
!0–1
!3–4
!0–0
!0–0
!0–2
!2 / 81
!121–79
!61%
|-
|colspan=24 align=left|Career statistics
|-
!!!|2003!!2004!!2005!!2006!!2007!!2008!!2009!!2010!!2011!!2012!!2013!!2014!!2015!!2016!!2017!!2018!!2019!!2020!!2021
!2022!!SR!!W–L!!Win %
|- bgcolor="efefef" 
| style="text-align:left" |Tournaments
|0
|2
|1
|0
|10
|16
|23
|15
|24
|24
|17
|18
|16
|16
|19
|6
|20
|2
|8
|7
| colspan="3" |244
|-bgcolor=efefef 
!style=text-align:left|Finals
!0
!0
!0
!0
!0
!3
!3
!0
!6
!4
!2
!2
!2
!1
!5
!0
!2
!0
!0
!0
!colspan=3|30
|-bgcolor=efefef 
!style=text-align:left|Titles
!0
!0
!0
!0
!0
!2
!3
!0
!2
!2
!1
!1
!1
!0
!4
!0
!2
!0
!0
!0
!colspan=3|18
|-bgcolor=efefef 
|align=left|Hard win–loss
|0–0
|1–1
|0–0
|0–0
|6–7
|27–11
|41–14
|19–10
|38–15
|36–16
|23–10
|22–12
|20–9
|25–11
|27–10
|5–7
|24–12
|0–2
|1–3
|2–4
!17 / 162
!317–153
!
|-bgcolor=efefef 
|align=left|Clay win–loss
|0–0
|0–0
|0–1
|0–0
|0–0
|4–2
|8–4
|8–5
|7–6
|10–6
|12–4
|10–5
|10–5
|8–5
|7–2
|0–0
|6–5
|0–0
|0–3
|0–3
!1 / 55
!90–57
!
|-bgcolor=efefef
|align=left|Grass win–loss
|0–0
|0–0
|0–0
|0–0
|5–2
|0–0
|2–2
|4–1
|10–3
|9–3
|4–2
|4–2
|2–2
|4–1
|3–2
|0–0
|4–3
|0–0
|0–2
|0–0
!0 / 24
!51–25
!
|-bgcolor=efefef 
|align=left|Carpet win–loss
|0–0
|1–1
|0–0
|0–0
|3–1
|3–1
|2–0
| colspan="13" style="color:#767676" |Discontinued
!0 / 3
!9–3
!75%
|-
!style=text-align:left|Overall win–loss
!0–0
!2–2
!0–1
!0–0
!14–10
!34–14
!53–20
!31–16
!55–24
!55–25
!39–16
!36–19
!32–16
!37–17
!38–15
!5–7
!34–20
!0–2
!1–8
!2–7
!18 / 244
!467–238
!
|-
!style=text-align:left|Win %
!–
!50%
!0%
!–
!58%
!71%
!73%
!66%
!70%
!69%
!71%
!65%
!67%
!69%
!73%
!42%
!63%
!0%
!11%
!
!colspan=3|
|-
|align=left|Year-end ranking
|394
|163
|338
|212
|43
|bgcolor=eee8aa|6
|bgcolor=eee8aa|10
|13
|bgcolor=eee8aa|6
|bgcolor=eee8aa|8
|bgcolor=eee8aa|10
|12
|bgcolor=eee8aa|10
|12
|15
|239
|29
|62
|257
|
|colspan=3|{{Tooltip|' $22,458,018 |Career Prize Money – Singles & Doubles combined}}
|}

Record against other players
Tsonga's record against players who have been ranked in the top 10, with those who are active in boldface. Only ATP Tour main draw matches are considered:

Top 10 wins per season
Tsonga has a 45–88 (.338) record against players who were, at the time the match was played, ranked in the top 10.

National representation

Team competitions finals: 6 (2 titles, 4 runner-ups)

ATP Tour career earnings* Statistics correct .''

Notes

References

External links
 
 
 

Tennis career statistics